The Last Adventure may refer to:
 The Last Adventure (1932 film), a 1932 Italian film
 The Last Adventure (1967 film), a 1967 French film
 The Last Adventure (1974 film), a 1974 Swedish film